The Ackins House was a historic house in Floyd, Arkansas. Located on the east side of Arkansas Highway 31 just north of its intersection with Arkansas Highway 305, it was one of the small number of early houses to survive in White County at the time it was listed as a historic site.

Description and history 
Built around 1880, it was a -story timber-framed single pile structure with a central hall plan. A hip-roofed porch extends across much of the main facade, supported by turned posts. Despite later alterations, it was one of the best-preserved houses of this type in the county.

The house was listed on the National Register of Historic Places on July 11, 1992. It has been listed as destroyed in the Arkansas Historic Preservation Program database.

See also
National Register of Historic Places listings in White County, Arkansas

References

Houses on the National Register of Historic Places in Arkansas
Houses completed in 1880
Houses in White County, Arkansas
National Register of Historic Places in White County, Arkansas
Central-passage houses
1880 establishments in Arkansas